ABBA: Thank You for the Music, An All-Star Tribute was intended to be an American-British television special tribute to the Swedish band ABBA set for release in 2021 on NBC and BBC One. The special was later cancelled, as efforts switched to developing the ABBA Voyage concert residency.

Premise
It would have featured appearances by Agnetha Fältskog, Björn Ulvaeus, Benny Andersson, and Anni-Frid Lyngstad and a performance of their new song "I Still Have Faith in You" by their digital avatars, and also included appearances by a variety of musical artists performing ABBA songs such as "Dancing Queen," "Mamma Mia," "The Winner Takes It All," and "Take a Chance on Me."

Production
On April 27, 2018, it was announced that NBC and the BBC were co-producing a television special tribute to Swedish band ABBA. The special is set to be directed and produced by Johan Renck and executive produced by Simon Fuller. Production companies involved with the special include Fuller's XIX Entertainment. On May 4, 2018, it was announced that the special had been titled ABBA: Thank You for the Music, An All-Star Tribute.

In October 2021, it was confirmed that the special was scrapped, in favor of the upcoming ABBA Voyage concert residency.

References

Unaired television shows
British television specials
English-language television shows
Music television specials
NBC television specials
Cancelled television events
ABBA